Thomas De Bie (born 25 August 1997) is a Belgian footballer who currently plays for Tubize in the Belgian First Amateur Division as a goalkeeper.

External links

1997 births
Living people
Belgian footballers
Association football goalkeepers
Challenger Pro League players
Belgian Third Division players
Cercle Brugge K.S.V. players
K.V. Oostende players
A.F.C. Tubize players